The 1st Genie Awards were presented on March 20, 1980, and honoured films released in 1979. They were given out at a gala event at the Royal Alexandra Theatre in Toronto with Bruno Gerussi as host. Awards for non-feature films were presented at a luncheon the day before the gala.

The 1980 ceremonies were the first time the awards were presented as the Genie Awards instead of the Canadian Film Awards, and the first time they were presented by the newly organized Academy of Canadian Cinema and Television.

Ceremony
The show was broadcast on CBC Television, and noted for its Oscars-like production design, with production numbers including a jazz dance performance by Jeff Hyslop and Karen Kain set to the tune of "Dancing in the Dark", and female impersonator Craig Russell in character as Judy Garland.

The show was not without controversy. Award winner Christopher Plummer used his speech to criticize the distinction made between Canadian and foreign actors, calling on the Academy to treat "Canadian or Samothracian" actors equally. The fact that no French language films won any major awards was also a source of controversy. In addition, despite having duly released three nominations in the category of Editing in a Dramatic Film (Non-Feature), the jury used the moment of presentation to announce that they had deemed none of the three worthy of an award. Producer Sam Levene, in his acceptance speech for another award, called the decision an "arrogant slap in the face" to the nominees.

Several awards were presented in specialized categories which were carried over from the structure of the Canadian Film Awards, but were not retained by the Genies in future years. Many of those categories were transitioned to the shortlived new Bijou Awards for non-feature films in 1981, but that ceremony took place only once and was not continued in subsequent years.

Award winners and nominees

References

01
Genie
Genie